Brillo Box (3 ¢ off) is a 2016 documentary short film directed and written by Lisanne Skyler. It is produced by Sheila Nevins, Tristine Skyler and Judith Black under HBO Documentary Films. The film revolves around the Brillo Box soap pads, that was designed by pop art icon Andy Warhol and was sold for $3 million at Christie's auction having been refused by companies forty-year earlier.

It was shortlisted with ten other short-film from 69 entries submitted to the 89th Academy Awards in Academy Award for Best Documentary (Short Subject) category.

Plot
Brillo Box (3¢ off) follows a yellow Andy Warhol Brillo Box sculpture as it makes its way from a Skyler family's living room to a record-breaking Christie's auction, blending personal narrative with popular culture, and exploring how we navigate the ephemeral nature of art and value.

Synopsis
The film shows and discusses Warhol's work and ideas, and how the culture has accepted his work as a lasting commentary on society and consumerism art. Artist Peter Young is also featured in the documentary.

Accolades 
 Academy Award for Best Documentary (Short Subject) - Shortlisted.

References

External links

Brillo Box (3 ¢ Off) at HBO

American short documentary films
HBO documentary films
2016 films
Cultural depictions of Andy Warhol
Pop art
2010s English-language films
2010s American films
2016 short documentary films